The 12809/10 Howrah Junction–Mumbai Chhatrapati Shivaji Maharaj Terminus Mail is a Mail train belonging to Indian Railways - South Eastern Railways that runs between Howrah Junction and Mumbai CSMT in India.

Initially it connected Howrah to Bombay via Asansol (East Indian Railway) & Nagpur (Bengal & Nagpur Railway) until Kharagpur–Bilaspur section completion.

It operates as train number 12810 from Howrah to Mumbai and as train number 12809 in the reverse direction.

Overview
This train inaugurated before British India.September 25, 1893.It Connects West Bengal capital Kolkata (Howrah Junction) and Maharashtra capital Mumbai (Chhatrapati Shivaji Terminus). It crosses West Bengal,Jharkhand,Odisha,Chhattisgarh and Maharashtra.

Coach Composition
This train had LHB coach
 1 HCP
 1 EOG
 1 LSLRD
 2 Second Class(Unreserved)
 7 Sleeper
 1 AC Pantry Car
 2 AC 3 Tier Economy
 5 AC 3 Tier
 2 AC 2 Tier
 1 AC 1 Tier

Routes and Halts
 Howrah
 Kharagpur
 Tatanagar
 Chakradharpur
 Rourkela
 Jharsuguda
 Brajrajnagar
 Raigarh
 Kharsia
 Sakti
 Champa
 Bilaspur
 Bhatapara
 Raipur
 Durg
 Rajnandgaon
 Dongargarh
 Gondia
 
 
 Nagpur
 Sewagram
 Wardha
 Pulgaon
 Dhamangaon
 Badnera
 Murtizapur
 Akola
 Shegaon
 Nandura
 Malkapur
 Bhusaval
 Jalgaon
 Chalisgaon
 Manmad
 Nashik Road
 Igatpuri
 Kalyan
 Thane
 Dadar
 Chhatrapati Shivaji Maharaj Terminus

Loco
 From Howrah to Chhatrapati Shivaji Maharaj Terminus = Santragachi WAP-7
 From Chhatrapati Shivaji Maharaj Terminus to Howrah = Tatanagar WAP-7

External links

References 

Transport in Mumbai
Rail transport in Howrah
Rail transport in West Bengal
Rail transport in Jharkhand
Rail transport in Chhattisgarh
Rail transport in Maharashtra
Railway services introduced in 1870
Mail trains in India